Zygaena rubicundus, common name fulvous burnet,. is a species of moth in the family Zygaenidae.

Etymology
The Latin species name “rubicundus” means "high fiery red".

Distribution and habitat
This species is endemic to the  mainland of Italy. These moths prefer limestone grasslands, mountain slopes and open scrub with the host plant.

Description

Seitz, A. describes Zygaena rubicundus as follows:- All the wings red, also the hindmargin, only the apex and distal margin of forewing bearing a black edge, which is a little more than 1 mm wide. In Central and South Italy. Very local.

This species is closely related to Zygaena contaminei.

Biology
These rather small diurnal moths develop a complete metamorphosis which involves a pupal stage (holometabolous). Adults are on the wing between June and August. They visit flowers of Centranthus (Valerians).  The larvae feed mainly on Eryngium campestre and Eryngium amethystinum.

Bibliography
Hofmann, A.F. & W.G. Tremewan (2017): The Natural History of Burnet Moths (Zygaena Fabricius, 1775) (Lepidoptera: Zygaenidae). Part 1. – 630 S.; Munich – Vilnius (Proceedings of the Museum Witt).
Erstbeschreibung: Hübner, J. [1793-1832]: Sammlung europäischer Schmetterlinge 2: pl. 1-38.

External links
 Euroleps
 Hlasek
 Ibolli

References

Moths described in 1817
Zygaena
Endemic fauna of Italy
Moths of Europe